Stanislaus Clarence Kostka (July 8, 1912 – February 3, 1997) was an American football player and coach. He played college football at the University of Minnesota  and was a member of the 1934 Minnesota Golden Gophers football team that won a national championship.  Kostka played professionally in the National Football League for the Brooklyn Dodgers in 1935. He served as the head football coach at North Dakota Agricultural College—now known as North Dakota State University in 1941 and from 1946 to 1947, compiling a record of 8–17.  He was also the head baseball coach at North Dakota Agricultural in 1947, tallying a mark of 5–3. Kostka served as a lieutenant commander in the United States Navy during World War II.

Kostka, a squarely built 6-foot, 225-pounder who only played one year, received offers from the Bears, Packers, Giants, Steelers, and Brooklyn. "A team would send me a wire and say they'd give me $3,500," he recalled. "I'd send a wire back and say Green Bay or the Chicago Bears said they'd give me $4,000. I kept that up".  Kostka eventually culminated the bargaining by signing a $5,000 contract, along with a $500 bonus, with Brooklyn. "That was a big deal then," said Kostka. "I think like Nagurski was in the league about three years and making $400 or less. Most of the guys were making $50 a ball game."

Kostka was born in Inver Grove Heights, Minnesota and died in Fargo, North Dakota at the age of 84.

Head coaching record

Football

References

External links
 
 

1912 births
1997 deaths
American football fullbacks
American football linebackers
Brooklyn Dodgers (NFL) players
Minnesota Golden Gophers football players
North Dakota State Bison baseball coaches
North Dakota State Bison football coaches
United States Navy personnel of World War II
United States Navy officers
Sportspeople from Saint Paul, Minnesota
Coaches of American football from Minnesota
Players of American football from Saint Paul, Minnesota